In Greek mythology, Helenus (Helenos) was a gentle and clever seer. He was also a Trojan prince as the son of King Priam and Queen Hecuba of Troy, and the twin brother of the prophetess Cassandra. He was also called Scamandrios, and was a lover of Apollo.

Mythology

Early years 
In the earliest sources, Helenus and his sister Cassandra were given the power of prophecy by Apollo after their ears were licked by snakes. In other sources, Helenus was taught the power by Cassandra, but others generally believed his predictions. After gaining foresight, he was renamed from Scamandrius to Helenus by a Thracian soothsayer. Helenus predicted that if Alexander (Paris) brought home a Greek wife (i.e. Helen), the Achaeans would pursue, and overpower Troy and slay his parents and brothers.

Trojan War 
Helenus is described by Homer as being the greatest of augurs. He advises Hector to challenge any Achaean to a duel, which Telemonian Ajax accepts. Helenus led the third battalion of the Trojan forces along with his brother Deiphobus. He was also part of the Trojan forces led by his brother Hector that beat the Greeks back from the plains west of Troy, and attacked their camp in the Iliad. He is wounded in the hand by Menelaus and forced to retreat.

In the final year of the Trojan War, Helenus vied against his brother Deiphobus for the hand of Helen after the death of their brother Paris, but Helen was awarded to Deiphobus. Disgruntled over his loss, Helenus retreated to Mount Ida, where Odysseus later captured him. He tells Odysseus, perhaps after torture or coercion, how to capture Troy: they would win if they stole the Trojan Palladium, brought the bones of Pelops to Troy, and persuaded Neoptolemus (Achilles' son by the Scyrian princess Deidamia) and Philoctetes (who possessed Heracles' bow and arrows) to join the Greeks in the war. Neoptolemus was hiding from the war at Scyrus, but the Greeks retrieved him.

Aftermath 
Neoptolemus had taken Andromache, Helenus's sister-in-law, and Hector's widow, as a slave and concubine after the fall of Troy, and fathered Molossus, Pielus and Pergamus with her. After the fall of Troy, Helenus went with Neoptolemus, according to Apollodorus' Epitome 6.13. He traveled with Neoptolemus, Andromache and their children to Epirus, where Neoptolemus permitted him to found the city of Buthrotum. After Neoptolemus left Epirus, he left Andromache and their sons in Helenus's care.

Neoptolemus was killed by Orestes, Agamemmon's son, in a dispute over Hermione, the daughter of Menelaus and Helen, whom Orestes had been promised as wife, but whom Neoptolemus had taken. As the kingdom of Neoptolemus was partitioned, this led to Helenus acquiring the rule of Buthrotum, as king. "Helenus, a son of Priam, was king over these Greek cities of Epirus, having succeeded to the throne and bed of Neoptolemus."

Andromache bore him a son, Cestrinus, who is identified with Genger or Zenter, a legendary Trojan king and father of Francus. Some mythographers alleged that Helenus was given the hand of both Deidamia and Andromache in marriage, which helped consolidate his claims to Neoptolemus' kingdom. Helenus prophesied Aeneas' founding of Rome when he and his followers stopped at Buthrotum, detailed by Virgil in Aeneid Book III.

Other myths 
In one account, Helenus got his mother Hecuba after the Trojan War and they crossed over to the Chersonese where the queen was turned into a bitch. Helenus then buried her at the place now called the Bitch's Tomb.

In one version of the myth, Agamemnon summoned all of the traitors who helped betray Troy and honored their promises to them after the sack of the Troy. Two of which were Helenus and Cassandra who had always pled with Priam for peace, and how Helenus had successfully urged the return of Achilles’ body for burial. Accordingly, Agamemnon, following the advice of the council, gave Helenus and Cassandra their freedom. Then Helenus, remembering how Hecuba and Andromache had always loved him, interceded with Agamemnon in their behalf. The latter by advice of the council gave these their freedom. It is said that these four migrated to the Thracian Chersonese where they settled with twelve hundred followers.

In Geoffrey of Monmouth's Historia Regum Britanniae Helenus was captured by Neoptolemus along with many other Trojans, and taken in chains to Greece as revenge for the death of Achilles in the Trojan War. Under Neoptolemus' orders, they and their descendants remained in slavery until the time of King Pandrasus several generations later, when they were liberated by Brutus of Troy.

See also
List of children of Priam
The Golden Bough (mythology)

Notes

References

 Apollodorus, The Library with an English Translation by Sir James George Frazer, F.B.A., F.R.S. in 2 Volumes, Cambridge, MA, Harvard University Press; London, William Heinemann Ltd. 1921. ISBN 0-674-99135-4. Online version at the Perseus Digital Library. Greek text available from the same website.
 Dares Phrygius, from The Trojan War. The Chronicles of Dictys of Crete and Dares the Phrygian translated by Richard McIlwaine Frazer, Jr. (1931-). Indiana University Press. 1966. Online version at theio.com
Euripides, The Complete Greek Drama edited by Whitney J. Oates and Eugene O'Neill, Jr. in two volumes. 1. Hecuba, translated by E. P. Coleridge. New York. Random House. 1938. Online version at the Perseus Digital Library.
Euripides, Euripidis Fabulae. vol. 1. Gilbert Murray. Oxford. Clarendon Press, Oxford. 1902. Greek text available at the Perseus Digital Library.
Gaius Julius Hyginus, Fabulae from The Myths of Hyginus translated and edited by Mary Grant. University of Kansas Publications in Humanistic Studies. Online version at the Topos Text Project.
Marcus Tullius Cicero, Nature of the Gods from the Treatises of M.T. Cicero translated by Charles Duke Yonge (1812-1891), Bohn edition of 1878. Online version at the Topos Text Project.
Marcus Tullius Cicero, De Natura Deorum. O. Plasberg. Leipzig. Teubner. 1917. Latin text available at the Perseus Digital Library.
Pausanias, Description of Greece with an English Translation by W.H.S. Jones, Litt.D., and H.A. Ormerod, M.A., in 4 Volumes. Cambridge, MA, Harvard University Press; London, William Heinemann Ltd. 1918. . Online version at the Perseus Digital Library
Pausanias, Graeciae Descriptio. 3 vols. Leipzig, Teubner. 1903. Greek text available at the Perseus Digital Library.
Publius Vergilius Maro, Aeneid. Theodore C. Williams. trans. Boston. Houghton Mifflin Co. 1910. Online version at the Perseus Digital Library.
 Publius Vergilius Maro, Bucolics, Aeneid, and Georgics. J. B. Greenough. Boston. Ginn & Co. 1900. Latin text available at the Perseus Digital Library.
Sophocles, The Philoctetes of Sophocles edited with introduction and notes by Sir Richard Jebb. Cambridge. Cambridge University Press. 1893. Online version at the Perseus Digital Library.
Sophocles, Sophocles. Vol 2: Ajax. Electra. Trachiniae. Philoctetes with an English translation by F. Storr. The Loeb classical library, 21. Francis Storr. London; New York. William Heinemann Ltd.; The Macmillan Company. 1913. Greek text available at the Perseus Digital Library.

Male lovers of Apollo
Mythological Greek seers
Trojans
Princes in Greek mythology
Children of Priam
Characters in the Aeneid
LGBT themes in Greek mythology